The Vancouver Mounties were a high-level minor league baseball club based in Vancouver, British Columbia, that played in the Pacific Coast League (PCL) from 1956–62 and –69.  Its home field was Capilano Stadium. During the Mounties' first two seasons, 1956–57, the PCL still was a member of an experimental organized baseball ranking, the Open Classification, as it made a bid for Major League status.  However, in 1958 the PCL reverted to Triple-A when the Dodgers and Giants moved to California.

With their two terms during the 1950s and 1960s, Mounties were the first and second of Vancouver's three Triple-A baseball teams.  The city had previously hosted numerous clubs at lower levels, including the Horse Doctors (1905; 1907), Beavers (1908–17 and 1922, although the team was alternatively known as the "Champions" and "Bees" in 1912–13 and 1915), Maple Leafs (1937) and Capilanos (1939–42; 1946–54).  The Capilanos, owned by Seattle brewer Emil Sick, were a Western International League farm club of Sick's PCL Seattle Rainiers and named after his Vancouver brewery.  Sick also built Capilano Stadium, which opened in 1951.

History
The Mounties were affiliated with a number of Major League Baseball parent clubs: the Baltimore Orioles, Milwaukee Braves, Minnesota Twins, the Athletics of both Kansas City and Oakland, and as a co-op club working with the expansion Seattle Pilots and Montreal Expos in 1969.

The first edition of the Mounties was created after the 1955 season when the Oakland Oaks, a PCL member since 1903, relocated because of falling attendance and a dilapidated home stadium.  But the 1956 Mounties, a last-place team, drew only 53,000 fans—almost a third of the Oaks' home gate during their last year in the San Francisco Bay Area. However, a contending team in 1957 caused a spike in attendance to over 300,000 fans, tops in the Pacific Coast League. This pattern continued through 1962: Vancouver fans supported the Mounties during years when they ranked high in the PCL standings, and stayed away when the team was at the bottom.

In 1962, the Mounties finished seventh in the eight-team league in both win–loss record (72–79) and attendance (88,000). During the off-season, massive changes swept the minor leagues.  The Triple-A American Association folded its tent completely. Four of the Association's six franchises survived, including the Dallas-Ft. Worth Rangers, which joined the 1963 Pacific Coast League—where it displaced the Mounties and inherited their Twins' affiliation and playing roster.

However, this same franchise would struggle in Dallas in 1964 and return the PCL to Vancouver the following season to become the second edition of the Mounties.  Attendance held at between 120,000 and 140,000 fans for competitive, but non-playoff, clubs from 1965–67, but below .500 seasons in both 1968 and 1969 dropped fan support to 83,000, then 63,000 paying customers. In 1970, the club moved to Salt Lake City and became the Angels.

Vancouver was without professional baseball in the 1970s until 1978, when it received an expansion PCL franchise, the Vancouver Canadians, owned by Harry Ornest. After 22 seasons, the club moved south after 1999 to Sacramento and became the River Cats. They were immediately replaced by the current Canadians franchise in 2000, in the High-A (formerly Class-A short season) Northwest League.

Notable alumni
George Bamberger, manager and longtime MLB pitching coach
Sal Bando, All-Star third baseman
Jim Bouton, pitcher, author of landmark book Ball Four; his two-week stint with the club in April 1969 forms part of the book
Ed Charles, third baseman, 1969 "Miracle Mets'
Pat Gillick, Hall of Fame executive
Bobby Knoop, All-Star second baseman
Tony La Russa, Hall of Fame manager; over 2,700 wins in 33 seasons
Charley Lau, influential hitting coach
Denis Menke, All-Star shortstop
Lefty O'Doul, manager. At 59, during his term as skipper of the 1956 Mounties, O'Doul (who batted .349 during his 11-year big-league career), was a pinch hitter for one at bat; he hit a triple, the last hit of his career.
Blue Moon Odom, All-Star pitcher
Brooks Robinson, Hall of Fame third baseman

Yearly record

See also
Vancouver Beavers
Vancouver Canadians

References

Baseball teams in Vancouver
Defunct baseball teams in Canada
Defunct Pacific Coast League teams
Baltimore Orioles minor league affiliates
Kansas City Athletics minor league affiliates
Milwaukee Braves minor league affiliates
Minnesota Twins minor league affiliates
Montreal Expos minor league affiliates
Oakland Athletics minor league affiliates
Seattle Pilots minor league affiliates
1956 establishments in British Columbia
1969 disestablishments in British Columbia
Baseball teams disestablished in 1969
Baseball teams established in 1956